The Rwandan Movement for Democratic Change (French: Mouvement Rwandais pour la Changement Démocratique, normally abbreviated MRCD or MRCD/FLN), is a coalition of Rwandan opposition groups who mostly reside in the diaspora or in exile.

The movement is led by Paul Rusesabagina, a notable Rwandan activist, whose story forms the basis of the critically-acclaimed Hollywood film Hotel Rwanda.

History 
The National Liberation Front (FLN) is the armed wing of political party PDR-Ihumure and the MRCD. In 2018, the group claimed responsibility for two terrorist attacks in Nyabimata, South-West Rwanda, near the border with Burundi. The FLN was also suspected by Rwandan security forces of carrying out a fatal attack on a bus in June 2022. Many of its attacks have been carried out from the Democratic Republic of the Congo.

2021 trial 
In 2021, 21 members of the MRCD/FLN, including Rusesabagina and former spokesperson Callixte Nsabimana (also known as "Sankara"), were put on trial in Kigali in relation to the Nyabimata attacks. The trial received widespread international attention as a result of the high profile of Rusesabagina and the dubious circumstances leading to his arrest. On 20 September 2021, the judge convicted all of the 21 defendants. Rusesabagina received the longest sentence, of 25 years. Eight members, including Nsabimana received sentences of 20 years, while other defendants were all sentenced to at least 3 years of prison time. It is unclear whether the MRCD is resuming operations as a political coalition.

References

Political parties established in 2012
Political party alliances in Rwanda
Terrorism in Rwanda